The Venice Project is a 1999 American-Austrian comedy film directed by Robert Dornhelm and starring Lauren Bacall and Dennis Hopper. It includes a cameo appearance from Steve Martin.

Cast
Lauren Bacall  as Countess Camilla Volta  
Dennis Hopper  as  Roland / Salvatore  
Linus Roache  as  Count Jacko / Count Giaccomo  
Ben Cross  as  Rudy Mestry / Bishop Orsini  
Stuart Townsend  as  Lark / Gippo the Fool  
Héctor Babenco  as  Danilo Danuzzi  
Dean Stockwell  as  Sen. Campbell  
John Wood  as  The Viscount  
Stockard Channing  as  Chandra Chase  
Victoria Duffy as Jenna
Anna Galiena as Maria/Sophia
Mía Maestro as Danilla
Parker Posey as Mira
Frederique van der Wal as Alana/Lucrezia
Eddie Ruscha as J.J. Rinquist
Lucia Hwong as Lutist
Gerd Böckmann as Pendergrass
John Guare as himself
Hans Hollein as himself
Lauren Hutton as herself
Cheech Marin as himself
Steve Martin as himself

External links
 

1999 films
English-language Austrian films
1999 comedy films
American comedy films
Austrian comedy films
Films directed by Robert Dornhelm
Films scored by Harald Kloser
Films set in Venice
Films about the arts
1990s English-language films
1990s American films